The electoral district of Bentleigh is an electoral district of the Victorian Legislative Assembly. It also includes the Moorabbin campus of the Monash Medical Centre. It lies within the Southern Metropolitan Region of the upper house, the Legislative Council.

Bentleigh has usually been seen as a key marginal seat, lying at the 'point of the pendulum' needed to change government. It is considered a bellwether seat in Victoria, having elected a member of the governing party in all but two elections of its existence.

It was created in 1967 as a fairly safe Liberal seat during the height of the Victorian Liberals' popularity. It remained in Liberal hands until 1979 where the Liberals nearly lost their majority for the first time in just under three decades. For most of the time since then, it has been a marginal seat, and is part of the belt of marginal seats in eastern Melbourne that usually decide elections in Victoria.

Labor then held the seat until the Kennett landslide of 1992. Following this, the seat was narrowly held by Inga Peulich until she was tipped out of office by Rob Hudson in the 2002 election. In the 2010 election the seat returned to the Liberals with Elizabeth Miller narrowly defeating Hudson. Bentleigh was actually the last seat to be decided, and Miller's victory allowed the Coalition to form government by one seat. In turn, Miller was ousted by Labor candidate Nick Staikos at the 2014 election. Staikos picked up a hefty swing of over 11 percent in Labor's landslide victory of 2018 and now sits on a majority of 61.9 percent, easily the strongest result for Labor in the seat's history.

Members for Bentleigh

Election results

References

External links
 Electorate profile: Bentleigh District, Victorian Electoral Commission

Electoral districts of Victoria (Australia)
1967 establishments in Australia
City of Glen Eira
City of Kingston (Victoria)
Electoral districts and divisions of Greater Melbourne